Troglocaris is a genus of freshwater shrimp in the family Atyidae. These stygobitic, whitish and eyeless shrimp are found in Southern Europe (Dinaric Alps and West Caucasus). Although locally very common, the small ranges of the individual species make them highly vulnerable to habitat loss, for example by water extraction. In some Dinaric caves, notably Vjetrenica, as many as three species may occur together.

These shrimp sometimes fall prey to olm salamanders, but are able to survive injuries if the attack fails. The Dinaric Troglocaris are the main host of several species of parasitic or epizoic flatworms of the family Scutariellidae (order Temnocephalida).

Species
Troglocaris currently contains 15 described species, but there are also a number of undescribed species. Gallocaris inermis, a stygobitic shrimp from southern France, was formerly included in Troglocaris.

Subgenus Troglocaris
Troglocaris anophthalmus (Kollar, 1848)
Troglocaris bosnica Sket & Zakšek, 2009
Troglocaris planinensis Birštejn, 1948

Subgenus Xiphocaridinella
Troglocaris ablaskiri Birštejn, 1939
Troglocaris birsteini Mugue, Zueva & Ershov, 2001
Troglocaris fagei Birštejn, 1939
Troglocaris jusbaschjani Birštejn, 1948
Troglocaris kutaissiana (Sadovskij, 1930)
Troglocaris osterloffi Juzbaš'jan, 1940
Troglocaris otapi Marin, 2018

Subgenus Troglocaridella
Troglocaris hercegovinensis (Babić, 1922)

Subgenus Spelaeocaris
Troglocaris kapellana Sket & Zakšek, 2009
Troglocaris neglecta Sket & Zakšek, 2009
Troglocaris prasence Sket & Zakšek, 2009
Troglocaris pretneri (Matjašič, 1956)

See also
 Typhlatya – the only other atyid shrimp from subterranean habitats in Europe
 Typhlocaris – the only non-atyid shrimp from subterranean habitats in Europe

References

External links

Atyidae
Taxonomy articles created by Polbot
Cave shrimp